Bryan Edward Nesbitt (b. January 24, 1969 in Phoenix, Arizona)  is an automobile designer and currently head of General Motors Corporation International Operations Design, based in Shanghai, China. Nesbitt is also brand chairman for Wuling and Baojun, two automakers with which GM has joint ventures.

Previously Nesbitt had held the position of GM's North American Exterior Design and Global Architecture Strategy and had been a designer with Chrysler. Several of his more prominent styling contributions have been to the Chrysler PT Cruiser, the similarly retro Chevrolet HHR, the seventh generation Chevrolet Malibu. and the 1997 Chrysler CCV, which had been conceived as a Chinese people's car with bodywork constructed of recycled plastic bottles.

Background
Bryan Edward Nesbitt was born in Phoenix, Arizona and had wanted to be an automobile designer since his childhood. He studied Architecture and Industrial Design at the Georgia Institute of Technology and holds a bachelor's degree with Honors in Transportation Design from the Art Center College of Design in Pasadena, California.

Speaking of the childhood influences on his design perspective, Nesbitt cited several summer drives across North America in an AMC Gremlin with his mother:

Career

At DaimlerChrysler for seven years, Nesbitt designed the 1999 PT Cruiser concept vehicles, the 1998 Chrysler Pronto Cruizer and the 1997 Chrysler CCV.  Nesbitt joined General Motors in April 2001 as chief designer for the Chevrolet brand. In January 2002, Nesbitt was appointed executive director in design and body-frame integral architectures for all North American GM brands. He became Executive Director of GM Europe Design in February 2004, and was responsible for all Opel, Saab, and Vauxhall design activities. In June 2007, he returned to the U.S. as the General Motors Vice-President of Design for North America, responsible for all brands marketed and sold in the United States, Canada, and Mexico—at the time those were Chevrolet, Cadillac, Buick, Pontiac, Saab, Saturn, GMC, and Hummer. In July 2009, GM put Nesbitt in charge of the Cadillac brand, then removed him from that position on 2 March 2010 back to his old position as executive director of the advanced concept group.

As one of the youngest GM designers, Nesbitt contributed to the design of the Pontiac Solstice, Pontiac G6 coupe, Cadillac DTS and BLS, Buick Lucerne, Chevrolet Impala, HHR and Cobalt coupe, Saturn Aura and Sky, and GMC Acadia, Saturn Outlook, and Buick Enclave.

In a 2001 USA Today article, Bob Lutz clarified Nesbitt's role in the Chevrolet HHR design:

In a July 2008 interview for the Atlanta Journal-Constitution, Nesbitt spoke of his design philosophy at GM:

Nesbitt won an Automotive Hall Of Fame 2002 Young Leadership And Excellence Award while at GM.

References

External links
 Photo of Bryan Nesbitt
 Bryan Nesbitt presents the Saab 9-4x BioPower Concept at the Boston Auto Show, Jan 2008

American automobile designers
Chrysler designers
General Motors designers
Living people
1969 births
Georgia Tech alumni
Opel designers